Chris Mosier (born 1980) is an American transgender advocate and triathlete. He started his athletic career before transitioning, started his transition in 2010, and in 2015 earned a spot on the Team USA sprint duathlon men's team for the 2016 World Championship, making him the first known out trans athlete to join a U.S. national team different from his sex at birth.

While he qualified, Mosier was uncertain about his eligibility to compete in the Duathlon Age Group World Championship Race in Spain in June 2016 due to the International Olympic Committee policy around the participation of transgender athletes,  with specific provisions from the Stockholm Consensus in 2004. In 2015, Mosier challenged the policy, resulting in the creation and adoption of new IOC guidelines for the participation of transgender athletes. Mosier was considered the catalyst for change in the policy in January 2016, after he successfully advocated for change in the policy to allow his participation in the World Championship and future races. Following the policy change, in 2016 Mosier raced in the International Triathlon Union Sprint Duathlon World Championship race in Aviles, Spain, becoming the first known transgender athlete to compete in the World Championship race.

In 2020 Mosier became the first openly transgender male athlete to ever compete in an Olympic trial alongside other men; however, he was unable to finish the race due to injury.

Mosier began competing in triathlon in 2009 as female. In 2010, Mosier publicly self-identified as a transgender man in The Advocate, an American LGBTQ+ magazine, after competing in his first race as male. In 2011 Mosier was featured in The New York Times prior to competing in the Nautica New York City Triathlon, a race he competed in two years prior as female.

In 2016 Mosier was chosen as the first openly transgender athlete to be featured in the "Body Issue" of ESPN The Magazine.

Activism
Mosier is the founder of transathlete.com, a resource for students, athletes, coaches, and administrators to find information about trans inclusion in athletics at various levels of play. He also works with LGBTQ sports leagues to improve transgender inclusion. Mosier has spoken across the world about inclusion in sports, his experience as a transgender athlete, athlete activism, and creating more inclusive spaces.

In 2019, Mosier joined the Board of Directors of Point of Pride, a non-profit which works to benefit trans people in need through gender-affirming support programs that empower them to live more authentically.

Mosier was previously the Vice President of Program Development and Community Relations for You Can Play, an organization that works to ensure the safety and inclusion of all in sports - including LGBTQ athletes, coaches, and fans.

Previously, Mosier was the Executive Director of GO! Athletes, a national non-profit network of current and former LGBTQ high school and college student-athletes which creates safer spaces in athletics through visibility, education, and advocacy.

Gender transition
Mosier struggled with gender identity at a young age. He knew at the age of four years that his gender identity (male) and biological sex (female) did not match. He began his transition in 2010 when he legally changed his name, and then began to receive testosterone injections. By making this transition, Mosier gave up his top ranking in the women's category.

Mosier spoke about his experience with Chicago Go Pride, saying, "Competing as a woman, I thought about gender all the time, to a point where it interfered with my ability to be successful because I didn't feel comfortable at races. Now, I feel more able to focus and gender doesn't come up as much."

Coaching activity
Mosier is a USA Triathlon certified coach. He has also been a coach and ambassador for the Empire Triathlon Club in NYC since 2012, and in 2017 began coaching at EDGE Athlete Lounge in Chicago, Illinois. In 2014, he was named 2014's Best Personal Trainer of the Northeast by Competitor magazine.

Athletic achievements 
Mosier made Team USA for the first time in sprint duathlon in 2015. He made the long course duathlon team in 2016 at a race in Cary, North Carolina. Mosier made his fourth Team USA team in long course duathlon in the 2017 National Championship, where he placed 2nd in his 35-39 age group and finished 50th overall with a time of 02:40:27..

In 2016, Mosier earned All-American honors in duathlon.

In 2019, Mosier won two National Championships in Race Walking.

In 2020, Mosier competed in the US Olympic Team Trials for the 50k Racewalk event; however, he was unable to finish the race due to injury. As such, he became the first known transgender athlete to compete in the Olympic Trials in the gender with which they identify.

Awards 
In 2011, Mosier was one of three finalists for the Compete Magazine Athlete of the Year award in 2011.

In 2011, Mosier was given an honorable mention by USA Triathlon for the 2011 USAT Spirit of Multisport Awards. Mosier was honored for his work in promoting trans visibility and LGBT inclusion in multisport and his commitment to advocating for all people to have the opportunity to feel safe, compete, and thrive in sports.

In 2013, Mosier was named Athlete of the Year at the Compete Sports Diversity Awards in Los Angeles, California.

Mosier was named to the 2014 Trans 100 list. The "Trans 100" is an annual list of some of the most prominent and influential individuals who identify as trans and are actively working towards creating a better world for the transgender community.

In 2014, Mosier was named as an inductee into the National Gay and Lesbian Sports Hall of Fame, thus making him the first openly transgender man inducted.

In 2014 Mosier was also included as part of The Advocate'''s annual "40 Under 40" list.

In 2014, he was named 2014's Best Personal Trainer of the Northeast by Competitor magazine.

In 2015, Mosier was honored by USA Triathlon as the 2014 Jeff Jewell Spirit of Multisport award winner.

In 2015, Mosier was awarded the Sports Pillar Award from the World OutGames Miami 2017 at the organization's Bronze Bash event.

In 2016, Mosier was named Outsports'' Person of the Year.

In 2016, Mosier was named to the Out magazine OUT100 list.

In 2016, Mosier earned All-American honors in duathlon.

In 2018, Mosier was named as a Beyond Sport Ambassador.

References

External links 
 Heffernan, Danny. Transgender Triathlete Chris Mosier on Transition and Inclusion in Sports | GLAAD. 
 TransAthlete
 The Trans 100 List 2014

1980 births
Living people
American LGBT sportspeople
Transgender sportsmen
Transgender men
American male triathletes
American LGBT rights activists
LGBT people from Illinois
LGBT triathletes
Sportspeople from Chicago
21st-century LGBT people